Godavari may refer to the films:

 Godavari (2006 film)
 Godavari (2021 film)